Vukovar–Borovo Naselje railway station is a railway station in Croatia. The station is operated by Croatian Railways, the state-owned railway company. It is located in Borovo Naselje. It serves as the primary train station in Vukovar connected to the
Vinkovci railway station, the second largest station in Croatia after Zagreb Glavni kolodvor. Local train to Vinkovci stops at local train station in Bršadin (Bršadin-Lipovača train station), Pačetin (Bršadin train station) and Nuštar (Nuštar train station).

References 

Railway stations in Croatia